Francisco Sebastián Ibáñez Velázquez (born 17 April 1998) is a Uruguayan footballer who plays as a defender for Albion in the Uruguayan Primera División.

Career

Early career
Raised in La Paloma, a town within the Uruguayan department of Rocha, Ibáñez spent much of his youth career with local club Atlántico Baby Fútbol, later moving to Montevideo to join Racing Club.

Racing Club
Ibáñez began his senior career with Racing Club in 2018, making his competitive debut for the club on 29 July 2018 in a 0–0 draw with Atenas. He scored his first goal for the club later that season, scoring the equalizer in an eventual 2–1 victory over Fénix.

Albion
Prior to the 2021 season, Ibáñez joined Albion in the Uruguayan Segunda División. He made his debut on 30 June 2021, appearing as a 56th-minute substitute for Leandro Zazpe in a 2–1 defeat to Central Español.

Career statistics

Club

References

External links

1998 births
Living people
Racing Club de Montevideo players
Albion F.C. players
Uruguayan Primera División players
Uruguayan Segunda División players
Uruguayan footballers
Association football defenders